Centro Olímpico Juan Pablo Duarte (translation: Juan Pablo Duarte Olympic Center) is a multi-venued athletic complex in Santo Domingo, Dominican Republic. It was initially built for the 1974 Central American and Caribbean Games, and also hosted multiple venues of the 2003 Pan American Games.

As of 2011, the complex has fallen into disrepair and efforts are underway to preserve the complex and maintain it.

References

 www.adn.gov.do —website of the Dominican Republic's National District

Olympic Parks
Venues of the 2003 Pan American Games
Athletics (track and field) venues in the Dominican Republic
Baseball venues in the Dominican Republic
Basketball venues in the Dominican Republic
Football venues in the Dominican Republic
Handball venues in the Dominican Republic
Indoor arenas in the Dominican Republic
Softball venues in the Dominican Republic
Swimming venues in the Dominican Republic
Tennis venues in the Dominican Republic
Velodromes in the Dominican Republic
Volleyball venues in the Dominican Republic
Sports venues in Santo Domingo